Ruth Cardoso (born Ruth Volkl; February 9, 1934 – February 11, 2000) was a Brazilian chess player born in Belmonte.  She was awarded the title Woman International Master by the International Chess Federation in 1970.

References

External links
 
 International Tournament Record of Ruth Cardoso
 Memorial Tournament to Ruth Cardoso in Brazil
 US Tournament Record of Ruth Cardoso

1934 births
2000 deaths
20th-century chess players
Brazilian female chess players
Chess Woman International Masters